Muhammad b. al-Haj Nuh b. Nijati b. Adam al-Ishqudri al-Albani al-Arnauti, better known simply as Al-Albani (August 16, 1914 – October 2, 1999), was an Albanian-born Islamic scholar and watchmaker, who in particular was a famous Salafi hadith scholar. A major figure of the Salafi methodology of Islam, he established his reputation in Syria, where his family had moved and where he was educated as a child.

Al-Albani did not advocate violence, preferring quietism and obedience to established governments. A watchmaker by trade, Al-Albani was active as a writer, publishing chiefly on ahadith and its sciences. He also lectured widely in the Middle East, Spain and the United Kingdom on the Salafist movement.

Biography

Early life 
Albani was born in 1914, into a poor Muslim family in the city of Shkodër. His father studied Fiqh in Istanbul, and was a leading scholar of the Hanafi School of Thought in Albania. During the reign of the secularist Albanian leader Ahmet Zogu, and because Shkodër was completely devastated by earlier Montenegrin sieges, al-Albani's family migrated to Damascus, Syria.
In Damascus, al-Albani completed his primary education in Al Isaaf Charity School with distinction, and due to his father's opinions from religious viewpoint, he created a curriculum for him focusing on religious education. He was initially taught by his father in the Quran, Tajwid, and Al Nahwah. He memorized the Quran, and studied numerous books such as 'Mukhtasar Al Quduri'. Hanafi Fiqh and further branches of the Islamic faith, also helped by native Syrian scholars. In the meantime, he earned a modest living as a carpenter before joining his father as a watchmaker.

Study 
Despite his father's systematic guidance to him imitating Hanafi School of Thought and his strong warning against studying the Hadith, he became interested in the Hadith, therefore he learned the Hadith at about twenty years of age, influenced by the al-Manar magazine founded by Muhammad Rashid Rida. Though he was largely self-taught, he transcribed and commented on Abd al-Rahim ibn al-Husain al-'Iraqi's Al-Mughnee 'an-hamlil-Asfar fil-Asfar fee takhrej maa fil-lhyaa min al-Akhbar. He followed this writing a series of lectures and books, as well as publishing articles in the al-Manar magazine. That work was the beginning of al-Albani's scholarly career, and for this book he became known in the scholarly circles of Damascus, and library allocated him a special room to carry out his research, and gave him a duplicate key of the library. After a while, he began teaching two lessons per week about doctrine, Fiqh and Hadith. His lessons were attended by students and university professors. He also began organizing advocacy trips to various cities of Syria and Jordan. Then, he obtained a leave from Muhammad Rabegh Al Tabakh, to profess Hadith in Islamic University of Madinah from 1381 until 1383 AH, and then he returned to Damascus to complete his studies, and to his work in the library, where he left his place for one of his brothers.

His teachers 
The most important teacher of Albani was his father. Moreover, he studied under Muhammad Saeed Al Burhani; where he studied a book named 'Maraqi Al Falah' on Hanafi Jurisprudence, and 'Shadoor Al Dhahab', a book on Arabic Grammar, and some other contemporary books on rhetoric. He also used to attend the lessons of Muhammad Bahja Al Bitar, scholar of levant

Later life and death 
Starting in 1954, Albani began delivering informal weekly lessons. By 1960, his popularity began to worry the government, and he was placed under surveillance. He was imprisoned twice in 1969. He was placed under house arrest more than once in the 1970s by the Ba'ath regime of Hafez al-Assad. The Syrian government accused Albani of "promoting the Wahhabi da'wa, which distorted Islam and confused Muslims."

After a number of his works were published, Albani was invited to teach ahadith at the Islamic University of Madinah in Saudi Arabia by the University's then-vice president, Abd al-Aziz ibn Baz.  Shortly upon his arrival, Albani angered the Wahhabi elite in Saudi Arabia, who did not like his anti-traditionalist stances in Muslim jurisprudence. They were alarmed by Albani's intellectual challenges to the ruling Hanbali school of law but were unable to challenge him openly due to his popularity. When Albani wrote a book supporting his view that the niqab, or full face-veil, was not a binding obligation upon Muslim women, he caused a minor uproar in the country. His opponents ensured that his contract with the university was allowed to lapse without renewal.

In 1963, Albani left Saudi Arabia and returned to his studies and work in the Az-Zahiriyah library in Syria. He left his watch shop in the hands of one of his brothers.

Albani visited various countries for preaching and lectures – amongst them Qatar, Egypt, Kuwait, the United Arab Emirates, Spain, and the United Kingdom. He moved a number of times between Syria and a couple of cities in Jordan. He also lived in the UAE. After Bin Baz's intervention with Saudi educational management, Albani was invited to Saudi Arabia a second time in order to serve as the head of higher education in Islamic law in Mecca. This did not last due to controversy among the Saudi establishment regarding Albani's views.

Albani returned to Syria, where he was briefly jailed again in 1979. He moved to Jordan, living there for the remainder of his time. He died in 1999 at the age of 85.

Views 
Albani was a proponent of Salafism, and is considered one of the movement's primary figureheads in the 20th century. Albani criticized the four mainstream schools of Islamic law and rejected the traditional Sunni view that Muslims should automatically turn to a madhhab for fiqh (jurisprudence). Instead, he spent much of his life critically re-evaluating hadith literature and felt that numerous previously accepted hadiths were unsound. This led him to produce rulings that were at odds with the Islamic majority. Although Salafism has frequently been associated with Wahhabism, Albani distinguished between the two movements, and he criticized the latter while supporting the former. He had a complex relationship to each movement.

Albani was amongst some leading Salafi scholars who were preaching for decades against what they considered the warped literalism of extremists. Politically they were quietists who rejected vigilantism and rebellion against the state. They believed that Muslims should focus on purifying their beliefs and practice and that, in time, "God would bring victory over the forces of falsehood and unbelief."

Albani's own views on jurisprudence and dogma have been a matter of debate and discussion. During a 1989 visit to Saudi Arabia, Albani was asked if he adhered to the lesser-known Zahiri school of Islamic law; he responded affirmatively. Albani's opponents among the mainstream have affirmed this as a point of criticism. A number of Albani's students have denied his association with any formal school of jurisprudence.

Albani openly criticized Syed Qutb after the leader was executed. He claimed that Qutb had deviated in creed and held the belief of Oneness of Being. Further, Albani accused Hassan al-Banna, the leader of the Muslim Brotherhood, of not being a religious scholar and holding "positions contrary to the Sunna".

Formula for Salah (Prayer) 
Albani wrote a book in which he redefined the proper gestures and formula that constitute the Muslim prayer ritual "According to the Prophet's sallallahu 'alayhi wa sallams practice." These were contrary to the prescriptions of all established schools of jurisprudence.

As he argued that several details of the concrete prayer that have been taught from generation to generation were based on dubious hadith, his book caused considerable unease. Albani's descriptions for the performance of the Tahajjud and Taraweeh prayers deviated considerably from established practice.

Controversies 
Albani held a number of controversial views that ran counter to the wider Islamic consensus, and more specifically to Hanbali jurisprudence.
These include:
 his view that mihrabs – the niche found in mosques indicating the direction of Mecca – were bid'ah (innovation).
 his view that it was permissible to pray in a mosque with one's shoes.
 his call for Palestinians to leave the occupied territories since, according to him, they were unable to practice their faith there as they should. This view was also controversial within the Salafi movement.
 his view that it is prohibited for women to wear gold bracelets.
 his view that it was not necessary for women to cover their faces.
 his view that the Muslim ruler must be from the tribe of Quraysh.

Criticism 
Albani and his methodology was criticized by a number of contemporary Sunni scholars, who consisted of various theological and political opponents. These included:
 In the early 1970s, Syrian hadith scholar Abd al-Fattah Abu Ghudda (d. 1997) published a tract against al-Albani's revaluation of Sahih al-Bukhari and Sahih Muslim.
 The Egyptian hadith scholar Mahmud Sa'id Mamduh, who studied with 'Abd al-Fattah Abu Ghudda and 'Abdallah b. al-Siddiq al-Ghumari. Mamduh has written at least four rebuttals of al-Albani's work on different subjects. In 1987, published a work entitled Alerting the Muslim to al-Albani's Transgression upon Sahih Muslim. He stated that:

 The Syrian Ash'ari scholar Muhammad Said Ramadan al-Bouti, took issue with Albani's well-known call for all Palestinians to leave Israel, the West Bank, and Gaza. He wrote two rebuttals of al-Albani entitled Anti-Madhabism: the dangers of an innovation that threaten the Sharia and Salafiyya: a blessed historical period, not a school of fiqh.
 Syrian hadith scholar Nur al-Din 'Itr rebutted some of al-Albani's views.
 Lebanese Sufi scholar Gibril Fouad Haddad dubbed al-Albani "the chief innovator of our time" and accused him of bid'ah.
 The Jordanian theologian, Hasan b. 'Ali al-Saqqaf, composed a book entitled ("Dictionary of al-Albani's Slanderings").
 Some American critics of al-Albani include the Sufi figures Nuh Keller and Hisham Kabbani.
 Safar Al-Hawali criticized Albani for his "categorical condemnation of Taqlid" and his "radical hadith based revisionism".
 The jihadist Sayyed Imam Al-Sharif considered Albani to be "wrapped in evil" and "not suitable to be a sheikh" for his alleged claim that Jihad is defined as forgiveness, education and prayer.

Awards 
Albani was awarded the King Faisal International Prize in 1999 before his death for his contributions to Islamic studies. The award committee described him as "considered by many academics as probably the greatest Islamic scholar of the 20th Century."

Over a period of sixty years, Albani's lectures and published books were highly influential in the field of Islamic studies, and many of his works became widely referred to by other Islamic scholars. Muhibb-ud-Deen Al-Khatib, a contemporary scholar, said of him:

Works 
Emad Hamdeh has described Albani as a "prolific scholar". He was the author of 217 books on various topics; such as hadith, fiqh, and creed.

See also 

 Rashid Rida
 Ibn Taymiyyah
 Ibn al-Qayyim al-Jawziyya
 Abd al-Aziz ibn Abd Allah ibn Baaz
 Muhammad ibn al Uthaymeen
 Muhammad Asadullah Al-Ghalib
 View on Mu'awiyah ibn Abu Sufyan

References

Further reading

External links 

 The Albaani Site – Translations from His Works – Updated Regularly
 Official Website of Sheikh Al-Albani 
 Pages 6-7: Al-Albani's Revolutionary Approach to Hadith - 2-page article on Al-Albani's hadith methodology in a backdrop to nepotism among Salafi scholars in Saudi Arabia

1914 births
1999 deaths
20th-century imams
Albanian Sunni Muslim scholars of Islam
Syrian Sunni Muslim scholars of Islam
20th-century Albanian writers
20th-century Syrian writers
Albanian Arabic-language writers
Carpenters
Hadith scholars
Albanian Islamic religious leaders
20th-century Muslim scholars of Islam
People from Shkodër
Albanian Salafis
Syrian Salafis
Wahhabism
Sunni imams
Critics of Shia Islam
Watchmakers (people)
Albanian emigrants to Syria
Atharis
Zahiris
Salafi Quietists
Syrian Islamic religious leaders
Biographical evaluation scholars